Cyclone Dirk was a large and deep European windstorm that affected Western Europe from the Iberian Peninsula to Iceland from 22 December 2013.

Meteorological history
Dirk formed over North America, some storminess was associated with the low in Canada, before it moved into the Atlantic. The preceding weather in North America saw a steep temperature gradient (temperatures in New York , Montreal ) which enhanced the jet stream in the North Atlantic. The low moved under this powerful jet stream where it explosively deepened before reaching Western Europe.

Deepening below  is considered uncommon in the North Atlantic, but has been recorded on a number of occasions, measured from ships transiting the ocean and from land based-recording stations.

This was not as low as the Faroese record of 930.3 hPa, set at Vagar airport during the passage of the Braer Storm of January 1993.

Forecast
The UK Met Office issued national severe weather warnings for wind and rain across southwest and northern areas of the UK for the 23 and 24 December. Forty to sixty millimetres of rain was expected across southern England and Wales on 23 December, with gales and severe gales with gusts of  gusts and blizzards over the Scottish mountains on 24 December. The storm was described as a "perturbation tempétueuse" (stormy disturbance) by Météo France, who issued orange warnings to parts of Brittany on 22 December. These warnings were expanded to an orange alert across 14 departments in Normandy, Picardy and Nord-Pas-de-Calais on 23 December. French Meteorologists stated the storm would not be as strong as the devastating Lothar and Martin, a pair of storms which hit France in late December 1999. The Norwegian Meteorological Institute issued a warning for Christmas Eve for the whole of Southern Norway.

Impact

Dirk brought heavy rain to most counties of Southernmost England, from Dorset to Kent,  of rain fell which caused many pockets of flooding on 23 and 24 December.

Northwestern Spain saw strong wind gusts, with coastal areas seeing large waves and wind damage. A strong frontal system from the storm passed over continental Europe.

The Alps saw strong Foehn winds with a Christmas thaw and several warmth records broken.

Weather stations in many parts of Germany saw the warmest 24 December since records began. Binningen in Basel recorded  ( above normal). In Salzburg on the north edge of the Alps  made it the mildest 25 December seen. San Bernardino, Switzerland saw the most one-day snowfall since measurements began (thus at least 1952).

Transport
In anticipation of severe weather, on 22 December rail companies announced that travellers with tickets for the following day would be permitted to travel that day instead.
Network Rail imposed speed restrictions from 16:00 on 23 December. Network Rail described the damage to rail infrastructure in southern England as worse than that seen during the St. Jude storm in October. 
 East Coast lifted ticket restrictions and announced it would run a scaled back service.
 East Midlands Trains said it would run a full service on 23 December.
 First Great Western Trains said there was major disruption between Exmouth and Barnstaple, Looe and Liskeard and Paignton. 
 Arriva CrossCountry services were not running south of Bristol.
 A landslip at Coulsdon in Surrey damaged a train and closed the line. 
 In France the railway services in Brittany between Brest and Saint Brieuc, and between Caen and Cherbourg in Normandy were disrupted, operations resuming on the lines on 24 December. 
 A commuter train derailed in Galicia Spain after a tree fell on the tracks, none of the passengers or crew were reported as injured.

In Finistere, France the Pont de l'Iroise was closed to traffic overnight on 23–24 December. The Saint-Nazaire Bridge crossing the river Loire also had traffic restrictions in place. The Queen Elizabeth II Bridge of the Dartford Crossing was closed from 12pm on 23 December with traffic running in two directions through the Dartford Tunnel. The Sheppey Crossing was closed, with the Orwell Bridge also closed to high sided vehicles near Ipswich. Denmark saw few problems with transport, but high-sided and wind-sensitive vehicles were being warned to stay off the roads, especially the larger bridges.

LD Lines cancelled boats between Le Havre and Dieppe to Portsmouth on 23 and 24 December, with a crossing between Saint-Nazaire and Gijon, Spain also cancelled. Brittany Ferries cancelled crossings from St Malo in Brittany and Ouistreham in Normandy to Portsmouth. Although the ferry from Cherbourg to Portsmouth was due to leave at 10.30pm on 23 December. Brittany Ferries also cancelled the Roscoff to Plymouth ferry. Irish Ferries cancelled the Jonathan Swift Fast Ferry between Holyhead and Dublin on the afternoon of 23 December. 24 December saw all Caledonian MacBrayne ferry services to the Scottish Western Isles cancelled, with the company hoping to run a relief service on Christmas Day. The Isle of Man Steam Packet Company also ran a Christmas Day service, after cancelling sailings, which the company said had not happened since the late 1970s.

The Port of Dover closed at 21:00 23 December due to strong winds and high seas, reopening at 07:30 the morning after.  Reports that several ferries spent the night unable to dock riding out the storm in the English Channel. The ferry MV Cap Finistere left on Sunday 22 on a service to Bilbao but turned back to shelter near Brittany after encountering a storm in Bay of Biscay; injured passengers had to be airlifted from the ferry. In the English Channel sea conditions were described as the worst in 16 years. Cargo ship Horst B ran aground in strong winds in the Faroe Islands. A cargo ship reported losing 30 containers overboard off the coast of Brittany.

All flights to and from the Scilly Isles were cancelled and rescheduled until 24 December. Flights to and from Southampton Airport were badly affected by the storm. Gatwick Airport's north terminal was affected by power disruptions on 24 December, stranding thousands of passengers as 145 flights were cancelled due to flooding of electricity substations at the airport. Heathrow cancelled a couple of dozen flights on 23 December. Bristol Airport and Glasgow Airport also reported some disruption. In Spain delays and cancellations were reported at airports in Bilbao, Asturias, Santander and Vigo.

Energy supplies
In France 240,000 customers were left without electricity, of which 130,000 were in Brittany. In Cornwall, 2,700 homes were reported to be without power, with 100,000 homes reported without power across Southern England. A maximum of 88,000 homes were left without power in Spanish Galicia. Ireland saw up to 30,000 customers without power from the storm.

Flooding

Saturated ground led to localised flooding in southern England (see first paragraph of Impact). A major incident was declared in the region of Leatherhead and Dorking with Fire Brigade unions calling off a planned strike in Surrey and Kent. An Environment Agency spokesman said flooding in Kent and Sussex were the worst to hit the area since Autumn 2000. In France the Breton town of Morlaix reported flooding.

Casualties
In France a 12-year-old boy was killed by a falling wall in Vire, lower Normandy. In the United Kingdom casualties included two men in England and one woman in Wales, with a further woman casualty in a car accident in Shropshire in what was described as "difficult weather conditions".

Aftermath

Manuel Valls the French Minister of the Interior while visiting the heavily affected region of Brittany, said an error had been made in the forecasting and preparation for the Dirk storm. He said that officials had severely underestimated the danger posed, and ordered Prefects to investigate what preparations and warnings were undertaken, saying that decrees describing the worst affected regions as 'natural catastrophes' (a constitutional French designation) would be published rapidly.

On 21 January 2014 the Energy and Climate Change Select Committee of the House of Commons of the United Kingdom held a one-off evidence session on power disruption during Christmas and the New Year. During the session the Energy Networks Association announced that around 750,000 customers lost electricity during the stormy period over Christmas, with 93-95% of these reconnected within 24 hours. The House of Commons Energy Select Committee on 21 January 2014 was critical of the speed at which UK power networks responded, however the company said that it was now much quicker than it had been in the past at responding to incidents. Mark Mathieson, managing director of SSE's electricity networks, told the committee on 21 January that: "It was just the impact of the event. It was a massive event. Certainly we haven't seen damage like this in the south back from the early [19]90s and even back to the Great Storm of 1987". He said that "tried and tested" plans made by the power companies struggled as wind speeds escalated significantly, and predictions failed to estimate the duration of strong winds which resulted in greater damage, coupled with the national reach of the storm which prevented regional distribution companies relying on mutual aid from other regions.

Gatwick Airport conducted its own investigation into the chaotic disruption caused at the airport on Christmas Eve, which saw police being brought in to help staff deal with passengers. The airport accepted all the investigation's recommendations and allocated £30 million for their implementation.

On 3 February Perils AG announced an initial insured property loss estimate from the storm at €275 million, which was subsequently raised to €352 million in the second loss estimate released 23 March 2014. The French Federation of Insurance Companies (FFSA) estimated the insured damage caused by storm Dirk to amount to 100 million euros in France, causing more destruction and costing more to French insurance companies than tropical Cyclone Bejisa to Réunion and Mauritius in early 2014.

References

External links
 Article on weather events in France 2013 with tabulated wind speeds of Dirk, Meteo-Paris

2013 natural disasters
Dirk
Dirk
Dirk
Dirk
2013 meteorology
2013 in England
2013 in Wales
2013 in France
2013 in the Netherlands
Dirk
December 2013 events in Europe